The 2014 Tour de France was the 101st edition of the race, one of cycling's Grand Tours. It featured 22 cycling teams.  The Tour started in Yorkshire, England on 5 July and finished on the Champs-Élysées in Paris on 27 July.

Stage 12
17 July 2014 — Bourg-en-Bresse to Saint-Étienne, 

This was a hilly stage which travelled from the department of Ain, into Rhône, with a brief incursion into Saône-et-Loire, and finished in Loire. The stage departed from Bourg-en-Bresse, heading west. The race officially started, on the outskirt of Bourg-en-Bresse, at Saint-Denis-lès-Bourg.

The race headed through Neuville-les-Dames and Saint-Didier-sur-Chalaronne, before travelling over the River Rhône to an intermediate sprint at Romanèche-Thorins. The race then turned south and headed into Villié-Morgon before passing through Régnié-Durette, over the Category 4 Col de Brouilly and through Odenas. The route continued south through Saint-Étienne-des-Oullières, Blacé, Saint-Julien and Cogny. This was followed by Le Bois-d'Oingt and Le Breuil, before heading south-east through Chessy and Châtillon to Lozanne. The route turned, and continued south, through Lentilly and Pollionnay to Vaugneray.

Stage 13
18 July 2014 — Saint-Étienne to Chamrousse, 
This was a high mountain stage which travelled from the department of Loire into Isère. The stage departed from Saint-Étienne, heading east. Racing officially started between Saint-Jean-Bonnefonds and Saint-Chamond.

The race continued east, passing through Cheyssieu, Cour-et-Buis, La Côte-Saint-André to La Frette. The route turned south-east to Rives, south to Tullins and then east to Voreppe, as the race travelled alongside the River Isère into Saint-Égrève. Grenoble was quickly followed by an intermediate sprint at Saint-Martin-d'Hères before a short climb to Uriage-les-Bains.

Before the start there was a minute of silence in memorial for the airplane crash Malaysia Airlines Flight 17. Many Dutch people were killed in this crash. Dutch teams and riders wore black ribbons or black armbands throughout the stage.

Stage 14
19 July 2014 — Grenoble to Risoul, 

This was a high mountain stage which travelled from the department of Isère into Hautes-Alpes. The stage departed from Grenoble, heading south-east. Racing officially started after passing through Eybens.

The race travelled through Vizille before turning east and gradually climbing to the intermediate sprint at La Paute in the valley just north of Le Bourg-d'Oisans. The route passed through La Grave, halfway up the climb. From the summit of the climb, the race descended south-east through Le Monêtier-les-Bains and La Salle-les-Alpes to the valley floor at Briançon. From the summit, the race descended  through Arvieux and along the valley south-east, south and then south-west to Guillestre and Risoul.

Stage 15
20 July 2014 — Tallard to Nîmes, 

This was an undulating stage which travelled from the department of Hautes-Alpes, through Alpes-de-Haute-Provence, Vaucluse and Bouches-du-Rhône, to Gard. The stage departed from Tallard, heading south-west. Racing officially began on the outskirt of the town.

The race headed south-west to Thèze and then south through Sisteron and Châteauneuf-Val-Saint-Donat. Here, the route turned west to Saint-Étienne-les-Orgues and then followed an indirect route west to Banon. The route descended from Banon, heading south and then west to Saint-Saturnin-lès-Apt. The westerly route continued through Cavaillon to an intermediate sprint at La Galine (Saint-Rémy-de-Provence). The race continued to Tarascon and across the River Rhône to Beaucaire. From Beaucaire, there was a further  to ride, west to the finish at Nîmes.

Stage 16
22 July 2014 — Carcassonne to Bagnères-de-Luchon, 

After the rest day in Carcassonne, this was a high mountain stage which travelled from the department of Aude, through Ariège, Haute-Garonne and Hautes-Pyrénées, before finishing back in Haute-Garonne. The stage departed west from Carcassonne, with racing officially starting as the route passed Carcassonne Airport.

The route continued west to Pailhes. The route then turned south-west through Sabarat, Le Mas-d'Azil, Clermont and Lescure to an intermediate sprint at Saint-Girons. From here, the race continued to Moulis and Audressein, before turning west to Argein, Orgibet and Saint-Lary. The route then headed over the climb of the Category 2 Col de Portet d'Aspet at  before a descent north-west to the outskirts of Sengouagnet. The race turned south-east at the top of the climb, for the final  descent into Bagnères-de-Luchon.

Stage 17
23 July 2014 — Saint-Gaudens to Saint-Lary Pla d'Adet, 

This was a high mountain stage which travelled from the department of Haute-Garonne with a brief incursion into the Lleida province in Spain, back into Haute-Garonne and finished in the department of Hautes-Pyrénées. The stage departed south-west from Saint-Gaudens with racing officially starting just beyond the Valentine district of Saint-Gaudens, on the opposite side of the Garonne River.

The race passed through Martres-de-Rivière before turning south-east on the outskirts of Gourdan-Polignan. The route followed the Garonne River from Loures-Barousse, through Barbazan, with an intermediate sprint at Saint-Béat. From here, the race headed to Fos before turning south and crossing the border into Spain. This was followed by a  descent continuing west into Loudenvielle and Génos. The race then travelled up the hairpin climb of the Category 1 Col de Val Louron-Azet at  followed by a  descent into Saint-Lary-Soulan.

Stage 18
24 July 2014 — Pau to Hautacam, 

This was a high mountain stage which travelled from the department of Pyrénées-Atlantiques into the department of Hautes-Pyrénées. The stage departed south from Pau with racing officially starting south of the Gelos district of Pau, on the opposite side of the Gave de Pau.

The route travelled south for a few kilometres, before turning east and heading to Pardies-Piétat and then south-east to Nay. The race continued east through Pontacq, to Ossun, and then around the southern side of the Tarbes–Lourdes–Pyrénées Airport. The route then continued south from Lanne, Bénac and Orincles. The race descended west through Barèges, and turned north-west at Luz-Saint-Sauveur, before reaching the valley floor at Villelongue and north to Beaucens. The route then began to climb north into Ayros-Arbouix.

Stage 19
25 July 2014 — Maubourguet Pays du Val d'Adour to Bergerac, 

This was an undulating stage which travelled from the department of Hautes-Pyrénées, through Gers and Lot-et-Garonne, into the department of Dordogne. The stage departed north-east from Maubourguet with racing officially starting between Maubourguet and Marciac.

The race travelled north-east through Peyrusse-Grande and Vic-Fezensac, to Valence-sur-Baïse. The route then turned north to go through Condom, Nérac, Lavardac and Buzet-sur-Baïse, to an intermediate sprint at Tonneins. The route turned north-east, once again, to Tombebœuf, then north-west to Miramont-de-Guyenne and wound north to Eymet. The route continued north through Fonroque, to Mescoules, and on to Rouffignac-de-Sigoulès. The race passed along the western side of the Bergerac Dordogne Périgord Airport, before the route finally turned east to cross the Dordogne River, into the finish in Bergerac.

Stage 20
26 July 2014 — Bergerac to Périgueux,  (ITT)

This short stage took place entirely in the department of Dordogne and was an individual time trial on an undulating road. The route headed north-west out of Bergerac, before turning north to the outskirts of Ginestet and Maurens, and on to the first time check at Beleymas. The road then bore north-east to Villamblard and north through Manzac-sur-Vern, before turning north-east again, heading to the second time check on the outskirts of Coursac. The route then zig-zagged north-east to the Côte de Coulounieix-Chamiers before crossing the River Isle and finishing in Périgueux.

Stage 21
27 July 2014 — Évry to Paris Champs-Élysées, 

This was an undulating stage which travelled from the department of Essonne, through Hauts-de-Seine into Paris. The stage departed from Évry, with racing officially starting at Bondoufle.

The riders travelled south and west around the Brétigny-sur-Orge Air Base to Arpajon. The race then headed east through Massy, north to Châtenay-Malabry, and on through Clamart and Meudon to Issy-les-Moulineaux, before crossing the River Seine and the Île Saint-Germain. The race turned north-east and travelled along the Right Bank of the Seine to Pont Alexandre III, where the riders crossed the Seine, again, and turned left, passing Les Invalides. The race followed the river along to the Pont du Carrousel and crossed the river for a final time. The riders then turned left to travel along the Rue de Rivoli, through the Place de la Concorde and onto the Champs-Élysées. The race then began ten circuits around central Paris, heading up the Champs-Élysées and around the Arc de Triomphe on the Place de l'Étoile. The riders returned, back down the opposite side of the Champs-Élysées, and around the Jardin des Tuileries. Finally, back along the Rue de Rivoli, and through the Place de la Concorde, to the finish line on the Champs-Élysées.

The La Course by Le Tour de France rode 13 laps of the traditional course on the Champs-Élysées a few hours before the men arrived.

References

External links 

2014 Tour de France
Tour de France stages